Sasuke Ninja Warrior Indonesia (or simply Ninja Warrior Indonesia) is an Indonesian game show and sports entertainment competition, based on the Japanese television series Sasuke which is aired on RCTI.

References 

Indonesian television shows
RCTI original programming
Ninja Warrior (franchise)
2015 Indonesian television series debuts
Non-Japanese television series based on Japanese television series